Cruz Martínez Esteruelas (4 February 1932 – 17 September 2000) was a Spanish politician who served as Minister of Education and Science of Spain between 1968 and 1973, during the Francoist dictatorship.

References

1922 births
2000 deaths
Education ministers of Spain
Government ministers during the Francoist dictatorship